The following teams took part in the Division I tournament which was held in Ravensburg, Germany, from April 11 to April 16. The winner of the group was promoted to the Top Division for the 2012 championships, while the last-placed team in the group was relegated to Division IB.  Divisional championships changed titles for the 2012 season, so this tournament became Division IA, and Division II became Division IB.

On March 29, 2011 Japan withdrew from the tournament due to the 2011 Japan earthquake.  They retained their place in the 2012's Division I, while the fifth placed team was relegated to Division IB.

Results

All times local (CEST/UTC+2)

Statistics

Scoring leaders 
GP = Games played; G = Goals; A = Assists; Pts = Points; +/− = Plus-minus; PIM = Penalties In Minutes

Goaltending leaders 
(minimum 40% team's total ice time)

TOI = Time on ice (minutes:seconds); GA = Goals against; GAA = Goals against average; Sv% = Save percentage; SO = Shutouts

Directorate Awards
Goaltender: Lolita Andrisevska, 
Defenseman: Susann Götz, 
Forward: Line Bialik Øien,

References

External links 
 Official website
 IIHF official site
 Complete results

I
2011
International ice hockey competitions hosted by Germany